Dorothy Cross (born 1956) is an Irish artist. Working with differing media, including sculpture, photography, video and installation, she represented Ireland at the 1993 Venice Biennale. Central to her work as a whole are themes of sexual and cultural identity, personal history, memory, and the gaps between the conscious and subconscious. In a 2009 speech by the president of UCC, Cross was described as "one of Ireland’s leading artists".

Early life and education
Cross was born in 1956 in Cork, Ireland, one of three children of Fergus and Dorothy Cross. Her older brother Tom went on to become a zoologist and professor at University College, Cork, while her older sister Jane was a swimmer who was on a team that set a world relay record at the 1985 World Masters Championships. Cross herself was a competitive swimmer in her teens, becoming All-Ireland champion in the 100-meter breaststroke at the age of 15 and going on to win other medals over the next few years.

Cross attended the Crawford Municipal School of Art in Cork before undertaking degree studies at Leicester Polytechnic, England, from 1974 to 1977. She also studied at the San Francisco Art Institute, California, from 1978 to 1979 and 1980 to 1982, where she completed an MFA Degree in printmaking.

Career

Exhibiting regularly since the mid-1980s, Cross came to mainstream public attention with her first major solo installation, 'Ebb', at the Douglas Hyde Gallery in Dublin, Ireland. This was followed, in 1991, by 'Powerhouse', at the ICA in Philadelphia, the Hyde Gallery and Camden Arts Centre in London and Kerlin Gallery in Dublin.  Like 'Ebb', several of the component parts that made up 'Powerhouse' were 'found' objects - many of which had been in her family's possession for years or were located from different environments. These were then incorporated into mixed media pieces for exhibit. Cross's general approach of creating works using found objects has been referred to as "poetic amalgamation".
 
During the early 1990s, Cross witnessed a traditional sieve created from stretched cow's udder at a local museum in Norway and stated, "Seeing that a cow could be used for something other than producing milk was a total revelation." In response, she began producing sculptural works, utilising cured cowhide, cow udders and stuffed snakes, which explored the cultural and symbolic significance of sexuality and subjectivity across cultures. For Cross, the use of udders generated a strange mixture of disgust, hilarity, and excitement. Virgin Shroud (1993), for example, is a veil made from a cow skin, with the udders forming a crown for the concealed figure; it references both the Virgin Mary and Meret Oppenheim's fur-lined teacup that was a partial inspiration for the piece. Saddle (also 1993) incorporates an upturned udder into the seat of a horse's saddle.

Cross is perhaps best known for her public installation Ghost Ship (1998) in which a disused light ship was illuminated through use of luminous paint, in Scotman's Bay, off Dublin's Dún Laoghaire Harbour. A recent series, Medusae, includes images of Chironex fleckeri, a type of jellyfish and was made in collaboration with her brother Tom.

The Irish Museum of Modern Art held a major retrospective of her work in 2005.

An exhibition, 'View', that took place between September and November 2014 at the Kerlin Gallery in Dublin, Ireland, included a series of new sculptures and photographs. The works, which are exemplary of the artist's complex exploration of the connection between humans and the natural world, and that play with material, relationship and time,  capture the artist's ongoing compulsion to agitate possibilities for new perspectives and points of view.

Cross was selected to be part of the curated 'Indra's Net' programme at the 2022 Frieze Art Fair in London.

Exhibitions

Selected solo shows
1988 Douglas Hyde Gallery, Dublin - 'Ebb'
1991 ICA, Philadelphia, Hyde Gallery & Camden Art's Centre, London, Kerlin Gallery, Dublin - 'Powerhouse'
1991 Camden Art's Centre, London - 'Parthenon'
1996 Arnolfini Gallery, Bristol - 'Even: Recent Work by Dorothy Cross'
1997 Angles Gallery, Los Angeles 
1998 Project Arts Centre, Dublin, Off Site Project, St Enda's, Galway - 'Chiasm'
2000 Mimara Museum, Zagreb 
2001 Frith Street Gallery, London
2002 Kerlin Gallery
2005 McMullen Museum of Art, Chestnut Hill - 'GONE: Site-Specific Works by Dorothy Cross'
2005 Irish Museum of Modern Art, Dublin
2008 Antarctica, Wolverhampton Art Gallery, Wolverhampton
2009 Coma, Bloomberg Space, London
2011 Stalactite, Heineken Ireland, former Beamish and Crawford Gallery, Cork
2013 Connemara, Turner Contemporary, UK
2014 Kerlin Gallery

Honors and awards
In 2009, Cross was awarded an honorary doctorate by University College, Cork.

In 2022, she was awarded an honorary doctorate by Trinity College, Dublin.

During her years in the United States, she won a prestigious Pollock-Krasner Award (1990). Her work has been supported by grants from the Wellcome Trust and the Arts Council of Ireland/An Chomhairle Ealaíon and Arts Council of England.

Works in collections
The Irish Museum of Modern Art, Dublin
The Norton Collection, Santa Monica
Art Pace Foundation, Texas
The Goldman Sachs Collection, London
Tate Modern, London, including Virgin Shroud (1993)
The Hugh Lane Municipal Gallery, Dublin
Arts Council of Ireland/An Chomhairle Ealaíon
Museum of Fine Arts Houston

Bibliography
 Allen Randolph, Jody. "Dorothy Cross." Close to the Next Moment: Interviews from a Changing Ireland. Manchester: Carcanet, 2010.
 Lydenberg, Robin. Gone: Site Specific Works by Dorothy Cross. Chicago: University of Chicago Press, 2005.
Cross, Dorothy, Enrique Juncosa, and Sean Kissane. Dorothy Cross. Milano Dublin: Charta Irish Museum of Modern Art, 2005. 
"Heat and Cold: Projects by Dorothy Cross and Lewis deSoto at ArtPace in San Antonio." tate: the art magazine. Winter 1996.
Wilson, Claire. "Irish Eyes." Art and Antiques. Summer 1996.
Isaak, Jo Anna. "Laughter Ten Years After." Art in America. December, 1995.
Higgins, Judith. "Art from the Edge." Art in America. December, 1995.
Murdoch, Sadie. "Too Much of a Good Thing." Women's Art Magazine. July–August, 1995.
Cross, Dorothy, and Melissa E. Feldman. Dorothy Cross : power house. Philadelphia, Pa: Institute of Contemporary Art, University of Pennsylvania, 1991.

References

External links
Come into the garden Maude part of the Medusae series.
Aosdána biographical note

1956 births
Living people
People from County Cork
Irish installation artists
Irish sculptors
Aosdána members
People from Cork (city)
Alumni of De Montfort University
Irish women artists
Irish contemporary artists